Marcus Gardley (born 1977/1978) is an American poet, playwright and screenwriter from West Oakland, California. He is an ensemble member playwright at Victory Gardens Theater in Chicago and an assistant professor of Theater and Performance Studies at Brown University.

Early life and education 
Gardley was born and raised in Oakland, California. The son of a nurse and a minister, he describes growing up in a home surrounded by books, ultimately leading him toward his academic path, at first wanting to become an anesthesiologist. Gardley originally studied and wrote poetry at San Francisco State University (SFSU), though his poetry professors told him that his poems read like plays. Initially not wanting to admit this, Gardley eventually came around to acknowledge that his poems often did incorporate elements of playwrighting. Regarding this time, Gardley later recalled: "Oh, this is where I belong. I don't like speaking my work, I like hearing my work. What I like about theater is it's like an orchestra. There are these different sounds from different people. I think of my plays as compositions in a way." Gardley earned the SFSU African American Student of Outstanding Achievement Award for 2000–1 and graduated with his B.F.A. He went on to earn his M.F.A. in playwriting from Yale School of Drama in 2004. Upon graduation, Gardley started teaching creative writing at Columbia University.

Career 
Gardley is among a new group of young African-American playwrights who have come to prominence during the "Age of Obama". These emerging playwrights are considered to be postblack artists. He has cited the Harlem art scene as influential to his work, with James Baldwin as a primary inspiration.

The New Yorker described Gardley in 2010 as "an interesting heir to Garcia Lorca, Pirandello and Tennessee Williams", and a "potentially great writer who has yet to write a great play".

Gardley's play ...And Jesus Moonwalks the Mississippi was produced at the Cutting Ball Theater and has earned both positive reviews and two sold-out extensions. ...And Jesus Moonwalks the Mississippi is a poetic voyage of forgiveness and redemption highly influenced by the myth of Demeter and Persephone. The play encompasses traditional storytelling, gospel music, and a humor to create a rich and vividly imaginative world. According to Gardley, "Jesus Moonwalks is in a lot of ways my signature play. ... it is based upon a story my great-grandmother used to tell about her father who fled the bonds of slavery and traveled the country in search of his family." In 2010, it was rated as one of the top ten plays in the Bay Area.

His play The House That Will Not Stand, inspired by Federico García Lorca's The House of Bernarda Alba, had its world premiere with the Berkeley Repertory Theatre in January 2014. The play centers on a black Creole woman who, recently widowed, must contend with the impending loss of her home and the privilege of being married to a rich white man in 1830s New Orleans; the work utilizes dark humor and stylized melodrama to tell the story of female sexuality and race relations. It was subsequently staged in London at the Tricycle Theatre, with an Off-Broadway premiere at New York Theatre Workshop in July 2018.

In 2013 Gardley began a three-year term as the Playwright in Residence at Victory Gardens Theater, through the National Playwright Residency Program, funded by the Andrew W. Mellon Foundation and administered by HowlRound. It was renewed in 2016 for another three years.

In 2017, his play black odyssey, commissioned by the Denver Center Theater Company where it premiered in 2014, was revised for production at California Shakespeare Theater. This second production reset the play in Oakland and included a new score by Linda Tillery and Molly Holm. It garnered 11 nominations and seven Theatre Bay Area Awards, including: Outstanding Production, Outstanding Ensemble, Outstanding Male Actor (Aldo Billingslea), Outstanding Female Actor (Margo Hall), Outstanding Direction (Eric Ting), Outstanding Costume Design (Dede Ayite), and the Creative Specialties award to Marcus Gardley for his adaptation of Homer's Odyssey.

In 2013, Gardley contributed a short play to The New Black Fest as part of a collaborative project titled Facing Our Truth: 10-Minute Plays on Trayvon, Race and Privilege, premiering in New York City. Gardley's piece, titled No More Monsters Here, features a black psychiatrist who prescribes that a white woman live as a black man for three days as a cure for her "negroidphobia".

In addition to his work as a playwright, Gardley has written for several television series. He served as a staff writer on the Amazon Prime series Z: The Beginning of Everything, and later as an executive story editor and writer for The Chi, which premiered on Showtime in 2018. He wrote for the Exorcist TV series.

More recently, he struck an overall deal with Amazon Studios.

Awards 
He was the recipient of the Helen Merrill Award in 2008 and the Kesselring honor award. His plays This World in a Woman's Hands (2009) and Love is a Dream House in Lorin (2007) have been named as the best plays in Bay Area theater, with Love is a Dream House in Lorin being nominated for the National Critics Steinberg New Play Award. Gardley is the author of the box: play about the prison industrial complex, which was premiered in Brooklyn in 2014 by The Foundry; black odyssey, which premiered at The Denver Theater Center the same year; The Road Weeps, the Well Runs Dry, which had a national tour in 2013; and Dance of the Holy Ghosts, which premiered at the Yale Repertory Theatre in 2004. He is the recipient of the 2014 Glickman Award for his play The House That Will Not Stand, which was commissioned and produced by Berkeley Rep. It had subsequent productions at Yale Rep and the Tricycle Theatre in London and was a finalist for the 2015 Kennedy Prize. Gardley was the 2013 USA James Baldwin Fellow and the 2011 PEN Laura Pels award winner for Mid-Career Playwright. Gardley has won the San Francisco Bay Area's Gerbode Emerging Playwright Award, the National Alliance for Musical Theatre Award, the Eugene O'Neill Memorial Scholarship, and the ASCAP Cole Porter Prize.  He is a member of New Dramatists, The Dramatists Guild and the Lark Play Development Center. Gardley was selected as one of 50 talented playwrights for audiences to follow by the Dramatists Magazine.

References

External links 
 Marcus Gardley's profile on the World Theatre Map
 

Living people
21st-century African-American people
African-American dramatists and playwrights
African-American male writers
African-American poets
American dramatists and playwrights
American male poets
Brown University faculty
Columbia University faculty
San Francisco State University alumni
Writers from Oakland, California
Yale School of Drama alumni
Year of birth uncertain
Year of birth missing (living people)